Julien Serge Doubrovsky (22 May 1928, Paris –  23 March 2017, Boulogne-Billancourt) was a French writer and 1989 Prix Médicis winner for Le Livre brisé. He is also a critical theorist, and coined the term "autofiction" in the drafts for his novel Fils (1977).

Early life
Julien Doubrovsky was born on 22 May 1928 in Paris. His father was a tailor and his mother was a secretary. His family was Jewish; in 1943, in the midst of World War II, they fled Le Vésinet and hid with a cousin.

Doubrovsky graduated from the École normale supérieure, and he earned the agrégation in English in 1949. He subsequently earned a PhD in French Literature.

Career
Doubrovsky became a Professor of French Literature at New York University in 1966. He subsequently taught at Harvard University, Smith College, and Brandeis University. He retired in 2010.

Along with publishing seven volumes of autobiography, he was known as a critical theorist. He coined the term 'autofiction', which has now entered the French dictionary. Doubrovsky's autofiction, while a literary sensation in the academic world, had unfortunate real-life consequences. While he was living in New York, teaching at New York University and writing chapter after of chapter of a barely-fictionalized account of his marriage and extra-marital sex life, his young Austrian wife, Ilse, was living in a fetid studio apartment in the outer-reaches of Paris. As Doubrovsky wrote his manuscript, he would mail each chapter to Ilse. Upon reading the last chapter, recounts the magazine Causeur in 2017, she killed herself.https://www.pressreader.com/france/causeur/20170613/281887298291315

Death
Doubrovsky resided in the 16th arrondissement of Paris. He died on 23 March 2017 in Boulogne-Billancourt .

Bibliography
Le jour S, 1963.
Corneille et la Dialectique du héros, 1963.
Pourquoi la nouvelle critique : critique et objectivité, 1966.
La Dispersion, 1969.
La place de la madeleine : écriture et fantasme chez Proust, Mercure de France 1974.
Fils, 1977.
Parcours critique, 1980.
Un amour de soi, 1982.
La vie l'instant, 1985.
Autobiographiques : de Corneille à Sartre, 1988.
Le livre brisé, 1989.
L'après-vivre 1994.
Laissé pour conte, 1999.
Parcours critique 2, 2006
Un homme de passage, 2011.

References

1928 births
2017 deaths
Writers from Paris
École Normale Supérieure alumni
20th-century French novelists
21st-century French novelists
New York University faculty
Prix Médicis winners
French male novelists
French literary critics
20th-century French Jews
20th-century French male writers
21st-century French male writers
French male non-fiction writers